The Shannon River Basin consists of the area containing Ireland's longest river, the River Shannon, and all of its tributaries and lakes. The official Ordnance Survey Ireland length of the Shannon from its Shannon Pot source is  made up of  tidal water flow and  freshwater flow.

Statistics

This is double the flow rate of Ireland's second largest river, the River Corrib. If the discharges from all of the rivers and streams into the Shannon Estuary (including the rivers Feale 34.6 m3/s, Maigue 15.6 m3/s, Fergus 25.7 m3/s, and Deel 7.4 m3/s) are added to the discharge at Limerick, the total discharge of the River Shannon at its mouth at Loop Head reaches .

The River Shannon is a traditional freshwater river for just 45% of its total length.

In addition to the Shannon Basin, the district also covers coastal parts of Kerry and Clare which drain to the sea. The main land use throughout the SHIRBD area is agriculture (70.7%). Peatlands (11.1%) and forestry (3.2%) are also important.

Furthest sources

Also the Boyle River has a similar claim. Thus the Boyle-Shannon river can be regarded as having the longest natural river flow in Ireland.

Geography
The River Shannon Basin touches more than half (17) of Ireland's counties:- Limerick, Clare, Tipperary, Offaly, Westmeath, Longford, Roscommon, Kerry, Galway, Leitrim, Cavan, Sligo, Mayo, Cork, Laois, Meath and Fermanagh.

Towns situated in the Shannon Basin

Towns and Villages (with 2011 populations) within the Shannon River Basin and the rivers and riverbanks on which they stand:

Shannon River: (going downstream)
Dowra
Drumshanbo (Lough Allen Canal - Left Bank) 857
Leitrim Village (L. Bank) 485
Carrick-on-Shannon 3,980
Jamestown (L. Bank)
Drumsna (L. Bank) 247
Drumod (Lough Boderg - L. Bank) 356
Roosky (Right Bank) 188
Termonbarry (R. Bank) 366
Cloondara (L. Bank)
Lanesborough 1,388
Athlone 20,153
Clonmacnoise (L. Bank)
Shannonbridge (L. Bank) 206
Banagher (L. Bank) 1,653
Portumna (R. Bank) 1,530
Terryglass (Lough Derg - L. Bank)
Mountshannon (Lough Derg - R. Bank) 152
Dromineer (Lough Derg - L. Bank) 113
Ballina (L. Bank) 2,442
Killaloe (R. Bank) 1,292
O'Briensbridge 235
Castleconnell (L. Bank) 1,917
Ardnacrusha
Limerick City 87,081
Shannon (S. Estuary - R. Bank) 9,673
Kilrush (S. Estuary - R. Bank) 2,695
Carrigaholt (S. Estuary - R. Bank)
Foynes (S. Estuary - L. Bank) 543
Glin (S. Estuary - L. Bank) 577
Tarbert (S. Estuary - L. Bank) 551
Ballylongford (S. Estuary - L. Bank) 418
Ballybunion (S. Estuary - L. Bank) 1,354

Shannon River tributaries

 Boyle river: Boyle 2,588
 Lung river: Ballaghaderreen (outskirts) 1,822
 Camlin river: Longford 9,601
 Hind river: Roscommon (outskirts) 5,693
 River Inny (Leinster): Mullingar 20,103
 River Brosna: Ballymahon 1,563, Ferbane 1,165, Tullamore (Tullamore river) 14,361
 River Suck: Castlerea 1,985, Athleague 241, Ballinasloe 6,577
 Little Brosna river: Birr 5,452
 Ballyfinboy River: Borrisokane 1,145, Cloughjordan 511
 Nenagh river: Nenagh 8,439
 River Graney: Scariff 798
 Ratty river, also named Owengarney River or O'Garney River,: Sixmilebridge 1,839, Bunratty 219
 River Fergus: Ennis 25,360, Newmarket-on-Fergus 1,773
 River Maigue: Adare 1,106
 River Deel: Rathkeale 1,550, Askeaton 1,149
 River Feale: Listowel 4,338, Abbeyfeale 2,007

Tributary Sub Catchments

Freshwater Catchments (With Areas - km2) Going downstream

Left Bank:

L Allen (upstream from L. Allen outlet) 415 km2
Eslin River 73 km2
River Rinn 311 km2
Camlin River 352 km2
River Inny (Leinster) 1,254 km2
River Brosna 1,248 km2
Little Brosna River 662 km2
Ballyfinboy River 182 km2
Nenagh River 321 km2
Mulkear River 660 km2

Right Bank:

Boyle River 725 km2
Hind River 78 km2
River Suck 1,600 km2
Cappagh/Kilcrow 414 km2
River Graney 295 km2

Estuarine Catchments Areas

Left Bank:

River Maigue 1,0002
River Deel 426 km2
River Feale 1,170 km2

Right Bank:

Bunratty River 233 km2
River Fergus 1,043 km2

There are many other smaller tributaries which join the Shannon along its journey.

Lakes

There are a multitude of lakes within the Shannon River Basin, both on the main river and throughout the sub-catchments.

Here is a table showing the major lakes:

See also
 River Shannon
 Shannon Callows
 Rivers of Ireland
 List of rivers in Ireland
 List of loughs of Ireland

References 

Geography of Ireland